, better known by his stage name , was a Japanese actor and singer. He appeared in almost 260 feature films and had a unique style of singing. His daughter, Sayaka Tsuruta, is an actress.

Career
Born in Hamamatsu, Shizuoka, Tsuruta was raised in Osaka by his grandmother, following his parents' divorce. A delinquent in high school, he finished second from the bottom of his class.

Tsuruta was studying at Kansai University when he was drafted into the Imperial Japanese Navy Air Service in 1944. After the war he joined Hirokichi Takada's theater troupe and made his film debut at Shochiku in 1948 with Yūkyō no mure, gaining a female following for playing handsome leads. He left Shochiku in 1952 to start his own production company. Prior, a romance with actress Keiko Kishi made headlines and Shochiku forced the two to end the relationship. He was attacked by the Yakuza in 1953.
He notably played Sasaki Kojirō in Toho's Samurai Trilogy (1954–1956), opposite Toshirō Mifune.

He joined Toei in 1960, and found success with 1963's Jinsei Gekijo: Hishakaku. In his book The Yakuza Movie Book : A Guide to Japanese Gangster Films, Mark Schilling cites this film for starting the ninkyo eiga trend of chivalrous yakuza films. For the next decade Tsuruta was Toei's leading and hardest working star of yakuza films, starring or guest-starring in a different film every month at his peak. Memorable films include Bakuto (1964) and Nihon Kyokakuden Ketto Kanda Matsuri (1966). Tsuruta was also a successful singer, scoring hits with such songs as "Kizudarake no Jinsei".

However, in the 1970s he struggled and his performances were criticized when the yakuza genre shifted to a modern more realistic setting. He made his last film in 1985, Saigo no Bakuto. Kōji Tsuruta died from lung cancer on June 16, 1987 at the age of 62.

Selected filmography

Films
 Eden no Umi (1950) – directed by Noboru Nakamura
 Battle of Roses (1950) 
 Tea Over Rice (1952) – directed by Yasujirō Ozu
 A Night in Hawaii (Hawai no yoru) (1953)
 Samurai Trilogy (1954–1956) – directed by Hiroshi Inagaki
 Samurai II: Duel at Ichijoji Temple (1955)
 Samurai III: Duel at Ganryu Island (1956)
 A Man Among Men (1955) – directed by Kajiro Yamamoto
 Nemuri Kyôshirô Burai Hikae (1956) – directed by Shigeaki Hidaka
 Yagyu Secret Scrolls (1957) – directed by Hiroshi Inagaki
 Oshidori Kenkagasa (1957)
 Yagyu Secret Scrolls Part 2 (1958) – directed by Hiroshi Inagaki
 The Loyal 47 Ronin (1958) – directed by Kunio Watanabe
 Boss of the Underworld (Ankokugai no kaoyaku) (1959) – directed by Kihachi Okamoto
 The Birth of Japan (1959) – directed by Hiroshi Inagaki
 Secret of the Telegian (1960) – directed by Jun Fukuda
 Gang vs. G-Men (1962) - directed by Kinji Fukasaku
 Chūshingura: Hana no Maki, Yuki no Maki (1962) – directed by Hiroshi Inagaki
 Jinsei Gekijo: Hisha Kaku (1963) – directed by Tadashi Sawashima
 Bakuto (1964) – directed by Shigehiro Ozawa
 Meiji Kyokyakuden – Sandaime Shumei (1965) – directed by Tai Kato
 Nihon Kyokakuden Ketto Kanda Matsuri (1966)
 Ceremony of Disbanding (1967) - directed by Kinji Fukasaku
 Bakuchi-uchi: Socho Tobaku (1968) – directed by Kōsaku Yamashita
 Bloodstained Clan Honor (1970) – directed by Kinji Fukasaku
 Sympathy for the Underdog (1971) – directed by Kinji Fukasaku
 Kizudarake no Jinsei (1971) – directed by Shigehiro Ozawa
 Golgo 13: Assignment Kowloon (1977) 
 Yakuza senso: Nihon no Don (1977) – directed by Sadao Nakajima
 Imperial Navy (1981) – directed by Shūe Matsubayashi
 Conquest (1982)
 Saigo no Bakuto (1985) – directed by Kosaku Yamashita

Television
 Ōgon no Hibi (1978) – as Sen no Rikyū
 Sanga Moyu (1984) – as Shigenori Tōgō

References

External links

Japanese male film actors
1924 births
1987 deaths
People from Hamamatsu
20th-century Japanese male actors
Japanese military personnel of World War II
Musicians from Shizuoka Prefecture
Deaths from lung cancer
Kansai University alumni
20th-century Japanese male singers
20th-century Japanese singers